Jean Rousseau (born June 23, 1961) is a Canadian politician, who was elected to the House of Commons of Canada in the 2011 election. He represented the electoral district of Compton—Stanstead as a member of the New Democratic Party. Rousseau was defeated in the 2015 Canadian federal election by Liberal Party of Canada candidate Marie-Claude Bibeau.

Prior to being elected, Rousseau was a worker in showbusiness. He studied in administration at the Cégep de Sherbrooke and has a Bachelor's degree in industrial relations from Université Laval.

Rosseau joined the Green Party in May 2016.  He was the Green Party of Canada candidate in Compton—Stanstead for the 2019 Canadian federal election.

Electoral record

References

External links

1961 births
Members of the House of Commons of Canada from Quebec
New Democratic Party MPs
Green Party of Canada candidates in the 2019 Canadian federal election
Living people
People from Val-des-Sources
Université Laval alumni
21st-century Canadian politicians